The 1989 Stella Artois Indoor was a men's tennis tournament played on indoor carpet courts at the Palatrussardi in Milan, Italy that was part of the Super Series of the 1989 Nabisco Grand Prix. The tournament was held from 13 February through 19 February 1989. Boris Becker won the singles title.

Finals

Singles

 Boris Becker defeated  Alexander Volkov 6–1, 6–2
 It was Becker's 1st singles title of the year and the 20th of his career.

Doubles

 Jakob Hlasek /  John McEnroe defeated  Heinz Günthardt /  Balázs Taróczy 6–3, 6–4
 It was Hlasek's 2nd title of the year and the 8th of his career. It was McEnroe's 1st title of the year and the 137th of his career.

References

External links
 ITF tournament edition details

Stella Artois Open
Milan Indoor
Stella Artois Indoor
Stella Artois Indoor